Jörg Landvoigt (born 23 March 1951) is a retired German rower

He and his twin brother Bernd were born in Brandenburg an der Havel, East Germany. Their father was a boatman:  their mother worked as a secretary.

Jörg Landvoigt had his best achievements in the coxless pairs, rowing with his twin. Between 1974 and 1980 they won all but one of the 180 races in which they competed, including four world championships and two Olympics; they only lost once, to other twins, Yuri and Nikolay Pimenov. The Landvoigt brothers also won a bronze medal in the eights at the 1972 Olympics and a European title in coxless fours in 1973.

Jörg is left-handed, whereas Bernd is right-handed. After retiring from competitions Jörg worked as a rowing coach at his club SG Dynamo Potsdam and later with the junior national team. Today he works for the Regional Sports Federation of Brandenburg. In 1998, he became the honorary chairman of the Havel-Regatta-Verein von 1920. In this position, he organises and plans regional and national rowing events in the areas of Potsdam and Brandenburg, such as the 2005 World Rowing Junior Championships in Brandenburg. His son Ike also became an Olympic rower.

References 

1951 births
Living people
Olympic rowers of East Germany
Rowers at the 1972 Summer Olympics
Rowers at the 1976 Summer Olympics
Rowers at the 1980 Summer Olympics
Olympic gold medalists for East Germany
Olympic bronze medalists for East Germany
Olympic medalists in rowing
East German male rowers
World Rowing Championships medalists for East Germany
Medalists at the 1980 Summer Olympics
Medalists at the 1976 Summer Olympics
Medalists at the 1972 Summer Olympics
European Rowing Championships medalists
Sportspeople from Brandenburg an der Havel